Shin-bang is a general sense of discomfort/pain in the lower anterior portion of the tibia that contacts with the tongue of the ski boot, especially when pressed against the boot. Shin-bang is not to be confused with shin-bite, a condition where your shin is rubbed raw due to irritation inside of the ski boot.

Causes of shin-bang
There are many possible causes of shin-bang. Most notable causes include: ski boots that are too big, skiing in a "back seat" posture, ski boots that are too stiff, aggressive skiing, and landing jumps or drops in a back seat fashion.

Reasons for these causes:

-Ski Boots that are too big: If your ski boots are too large your foot and ankle is able to slide forward and backward. When this motion happens, intermittent contact between the shin and the tongue/upper cuff of the ski boot takes place. This intermittent contact usually continues through the duration of your ski day especially on aggressive terrain that can cause the skier to migrate to skiing in the back seat.

-Skiing in a back seat posture: Skiing in the back seat, also known as skiing with your weight behind your feet, places a lot of pressure and strain on your lower legs. The poor skiing form not only intensifies contact with the lower part of your shin and the boot but it also can strain muscles that can make you feel especially sore.

-Ski boots that are too stiff: Skiing in a boot that is too stiff can effectively limit how forward you can get on your skis. With today's more up right ski boot stances, failure to properly flex a boot can almost force a skier into the back seat. When choosing a ski boot flex, make sure you can effectively flex the boot at room temperature, as it will only get stiffer with the onset of colder temperatures. Ideal flex on a four buckle boot is achieved when the middle buckles come in close proximity to each other but do not touch. Note however that stronger, more aggressive skiers can benefit from a stiffer flex boot especially if they consistently ski in a forward athletic position.

-Aggressive skiing: Skiing through rough terrain can cause a lot of shock to your lower legs. Examples include: those bumps you fail to see until you have already hit them, moguls, hard pack snow, crusty snow conditions etc.

-Landing jumps or drops in the back seat: This one gets almost everyone from time to time. In most cases the action causes muscles and tendons to stretch beyond their conditioned level. In other cases, the force of landing in the back seat can cause stress fractures in the Tibia. These fractures are most likely caused from the Tibia bending as a result of the upper cuff of the ski boot acting as a fulcrum for the upper body. Typically this can be the cause of chronic shin bang

Remedies for shin-bang
There are many purported remedies for shin-bang. The use of nonsteroidal anti-inflammatory drugs such as Ibuprofen may help some athletes ski through the discomfort, but rest is ultimately the most effective remedy. A properly fitting and flexing boot is crucial to preventing this condition. In addition to this, a post-skiing leg drain can help reduce swelling and refresh the shins.

Booster Straps

Booster Straps are a product designed to reduce shin-bang along with other benefits. Booster straps are an upgrade to your boot’s normal power straps which include an elastic portion. Booster straps allow you to cinch the power strap tighter, compressing the boot liner tighter to the leg. Additionally, the elastic portion of the booster strap allows skiers to stay out of the backseat and dorsiflex more due to the “forgiveness” in the strap.

References

 Bootfitting - The Carver's Almanac  (shin-bang, albeit slang, is a generally accepted term in the ski community)
 :104 (do.)

See also
 Shin splints

Skiing